Giuseppe Bezzuoli (28 November 1784 – 13 September 1855) was an Italian painter of the Neoclassic period, active in Milan, Rome, and his native city of Florence.

Biography
He studied as a young man under Jean-Baptiste Desmarais at the Academy of Fine Arts of Florence, and afterward spent some time at Rome between 1813 and 1820. He became a candidate to the professorship of painting at the Academy of Fine Arts of Florence after Pietro Benvenuti's death in 1844.

His large picture in the Academy include The Entry of Charles VIII into Florence (1822–1829). Some of his smaller works, such as The Galatea and the small copy of Raphael's School of Athens (1819), in the Galleria Tosio Martinengo at Brescia, give a more favorable idea of his talent. He painted one of the lunettes in the Tribune of Galileo at the Natural History Museum (La Specola Museum) in Florence, and the more important series of scenes from the life of Caesar (1836) in one of the rooms on the ground floor of the Pitti Palace. His Assumption of the Virgin is found in the Museo dell'Opera of the church of Santa Croce.

Other principal works include a Baptism of Clovis and a Madonna in fresco for the Pitti Palace. He painted two ceilings for the Borghese Palace at Rome representing  Toilet of Venus, and Venus carrying Ascanius. He died in Florence.

Among his pupils at the Academy were Giovanni Fattori, Giuseppe Raggio, Enrico Pollastrini, Carlo Ademollo, Giuseppe Pierotti, Stefano Ussi, and Silvestro Lega.

References

1784 births
1855 deaths
18th-century Italian painters
Italian male painters
19th-century Italian painters
Painters from Florence
Italian neoclassical painters
Accademia di Belle Arti di Firenze alumni
Academic staff of the Accademia di Belle Arti di Firenze
19th-century Italian male artists
18th-century Italian male artists